Neerdar is a river of North Rhine-Westphalia and of Hesse, Germany. It is a left tributary of the Wilde Aa near Korbach.

See also
List of rivers of Hesse
List of rivers of North Rhine-Westphalia

References

Rivers of Hesse
Rivers of North Rhine-Westphalia
Rivers of Germany